A pinhead is the head of a pin.

Pinhead may also mean:

 Pinhead, a person with microcephaly
 Pinhead (Hellraiser), the primary antagonist from the Hellraiser films
 Pinhead (Neighbours), a character in the Australian soap opera Neighbors
 Pinhead (Puppet Master), a character in the Puppet Master series of films
 Zip the Pinhead (c. 1857–1926), an American circus performer
 Zippy the Pinhead, a comic strip character
 Pinhead, a puppet on the American television show Foodini the Great
 "Pinhead", a song by The Ramones on their album Leave Home
 Pinheads, a group of sideshow circus characters in the stage play The Elephant Man